The 2018 American Ultimate Disc League season was the seventh season for the league. The Madison Radicals won the championship, the team's first. Rowan McDonnell of the DC Breeze won league MVP after the season.

Offseason
The Vancouver Riptide was the lone team to cease operations after 2017, with plans to move the team to Portland, Oregon and rejoin the league for the 2019 season. Stadium joined the AUDL as broadcast partner, replacing Eleven Sports Network. Stadium televised one game a week live as well as all three games during Championship Weekend VII.

Regular season

Week 1

Week 2

Week 3

Week 4

Week 5

Week 6

Week 7

Week 8

Week 9

Week 10

Week 11

Week 12

Week 13

Week 14

Week 15

Week 16

Standings

East Division

Midwest Division

South Division

West Division

Postseason

Divisional playoff

Divisional final

Championship Weekend VII 
Championship Weekend VII was held in Madison, Wisconsin at Breese Stevens Field from August 11-12, 2018.

The Madison Radicals won their first championship, and did so in front of a home crowd.

References

American Ultimate Disc League
2018 in American sports